Dudley Metropolitan Borough Council elections are held three years out of every four, with a third of the council elected each time. Dudley Metropolitan Borough Council is the local authority for the metropolitan borough of Dudley in the West Midlands, England. Since the last boundary changes in 2004, 72 councillors have been elected from 24 wards.

Political control
From 1889 to 1974 Dudley was a county borough, independent of any county council. Under the Local Government Act 1972 it had its territory enlarged and became a metropolitan borough, with West Midlands County Council providing county-level services. The first election to the reconstituted borough council was held in 1973, initially operating as a shadow authority before coming into its revised powers on 1 April 1974. West Midlands County Council was abolished in 1986 and Dudley became a unitary authority. Political control of the council since 1974 has been held by the following parties:

Leadership
The leaders of the council since 1998 have been:

Council elections
1998 Dudley Metropolitan Borough Council election
1999 Dudley Metropolitan Borough Council election
2000 Dudley Metropolitan Borough Council election
2002 Dudley Metropolitan Borough Council election
2003 Dudley Metropolitan Borough Council election
2004 Dudley Metropolitan Borough Council election
2006 Dudley Metropolitan Borough Council election
2007 Dudley Metropolitan Borough Council election
2008 Dudley Metropolitan Borough Council election
2010 Dudley Metropolitan Borough Council election
2011 Dudley Metropolitan Borough Council election
2012 Dudley Metropolitan Borough Council election
2014 Dudley Metropolitan Borough Council election
2015 Dudley Metropolitan Borough Council election
2016 Dudley Metropolitan Borough Council election
2018 Dudley Metropolitan Borough Council election
2019 Dudley Metropolitan Borough Council election
2021 Dudley Metropolitan Borough Council election
2022 Dudley Metropolitan Borough Council election

By-election results

External links
Dudley Metropolitan Borough Council

References

 
Council elections in the West Midlands (county)
Politics of Dudley
Metropolitan borough council elections in England